The action of 11 November 2008 was a naval engagement fought off Somalia between pirates and British forces. Russia has stated that its forces fought off the pirates also, though Russia's involvement has been disputed by the Royal Navy. When the Royal Navy ship , "attached to the NATO task force in the region" attempted to board a Somali pirate dhow with twelve pirates on board, the pirates initially resisted with assault rifle fire. After a brief shoot-out with the Royal Marines, two pirates were killed and the dhow was captured by Cumberland. The Times has described the incident as "the first time the Royal Navy had been engaged in a fatal shoot-out on the high seas in living memory." The Independent has also stated that the confrontation "is believed to be the first time recently that British naval service personnel have been involved in a confrontation that resulted in deaths", and The Toronto Star has stated that the engagement is "the first time since the 1982 Falklands War that the Royal Navy had killed anyone on the high seas."

Background

As of 11 November 2008, 32 ships had been hijacked in the Gulf of Aden by pirates. The Gulf of Aden has been described as "a treacherous stretch for ships, particularly along the Somali coast". To protect commercial vessels off the coast of Somalia, a multi-national task force was deployed to the area.

Incident
On 11 November pirates on board a dhow attacked , a Danish-registered cargo ship, using assault rifles in a failed attempt to hijack the ship. However, Russian involvement in preventing the pirates from capturing Powerful has been disputed by the Royal Navy.

Later that day, Cumberland detected the dhow, which was towing a skiff, and identified it as a vessel involved in the attack against Powerful. The Royal Marines unit on board Cumberland was dispatched in Rigid Raider craft towards the dhow. The Marines then proceeded to circle the dhow, which had on board 12 men armed with rocket launchers and machine guns, in an attempt to force it to stop.

The pirates opened fire on them, but no casualties were sustained by the Marines. Returning fire, the Marines killed two Somalis. The pirates subsequently surrendered, and the Marines boarded the dhow. The Royal Navy described the boarding itself as "compliant". Russia has claimed that one of its helicopters, based aboard Neustrashimy, was involved in this firefight between the pirates and the Marines, though the Royal Navy deny this claim, stating that the Marines were supported by a Lynx helicopter from HMS Cumberland.

Aftermath

On board the dhow was a Yemeni male who, despite receiving emergency treatment, died from his injuries.  The British Ministry of Defence reported that it was unclear as to whether the fatal injuries were the result of the gunfight, or whether they were sustained beforehand.  The incident, according to The Times, "signalled a new policy of maximum robustness for the Royal Navy on the high seas".

The remaining eight men who had been captured on board the dhow along with the bodies of the two pirates killed were transferred to RFA Wave Knight.  The eight survivors were handed over to Kenyan authorities in Mombasa on November 18 while the two dead pirates were later buried at sea off the eastern coast of Somalia.

Footnotes

Maritime incidents in 2008
Conflicts in 2008
Gulf of Aden
Piracy in Somalia
Naval battles involving pirates
21st-century history of the Royal Navy
November 2008 events in Africa